The Weifang International Kite Festival is an annual kite-flying festival held from April 20 to 25 in Weifang, China.

Weifang, Shandong, China is known as the kite capital of the world as people consider Weifang to be the birthplace of kites. Each spring, people in the city fly kites as a leisure outdoor activity. The designs on many Chinese kites have a symbolic meaning or illustrations from Chinese folklore or history.

On April 1, 1984, with the help and support of the Chairman of the Seattle Kite Association, David Checkley, the first International Kite Festival was held in Weifang. On April 1, 1988, the presidium of the Weifang International Kite Festival unanimously adopted a proposal to set Weifang as the "Kite Capital". In the following year, during the Sixth Kite Festival, the International Kite Federation was founded by representatives from  China, the USA, Japan, the UK, Italy, and twelve other countries, with the headquarters also being set in Weifang.
 During the Festival, performances are held in the evening with various Chinese singers performing at the gala.

References

External links

April events
Festivals in China
Kite festivals
Recurring events established in 1984
Tourist attractions in Shandong
Sports festivals in China
Spring (season) events in China